This is a list of notable events in music that took place in the year 1930.

Specific locations
1930 in British music
1930 in Norwegian music

Specific genres
1930 in country music
1930 in jazz

Events

February 7 – The 13th Sound Ensemble of Havana, conducted by Ángel Reyes, makes the first recording of Julián Carrillo's microtonal Preludio a Colón for Columbia Records in New York City.
February 16 – Nicolas Slonimsky conducts the first performance of Charles Ives's Three Places in New England.
February 17 – The Technicolor musical film, The Vagabond King, is released. Dennis King recreates his original London and Broadway stage role as Villon in this film, and records two songs from the film for Victor Records.
April 1 – Brunswick-Balke-Collender sells Brunswick Records to Warner Brothers, who are hopeful that the move will enable them to make bigger profits from their musicals by enabling them to profit from the sale of records. They also acquire four music publishers to profit from sales in sheet music.
May 10
Metropolitan Opera baritone Lawrence Tibbett's first film The Rogue Song, a lavish Technicolor musical, is released to rave reviews. Lawrence Tibbett records the songs he sang in the film for Victor Records.
The film version of the stage hit Hold Everything is released. Winnie Lightner and Joe E. Brown star in this Technicolor musical which opens to rave reviews. Of the film's song, "When the Little Red Roses Get the Blues for You", becomes a hit. Al Jolson records this song from the picture for Brunswick Records.
May 25 – The all Technicolor musical film, Song of the Flame, based on the 1925 Broadway musical of the same name, is released to rave reviews. The film stars Noah Beery and Bernice Claire and is nominated for an Oscar for "Best Sound Recording". Noah Beery records his song from the picture for Brunswick Records.
August 24 – Festival Puccini is launched at Torre del Lago.
October 29 – Bing Crosby makes his first recording with the Gus Arnheim orchestra as a solo vocalist. His new type of singing voice, a low baritone, becomes a sensation and will gradually displace (by around 1935) the standard tenor voice that had characterized the vocals of popular music in the 1920s.
December 10 – First performance of Bertolt Brecht's play The Decision, with music by Hanns Eisler.
December 13 – Ernest Ansermet conducts the world premiere of Stravinsky's Symphony of Psalms, in Brussels.
 December 31 – Record sales dropped 50% from 1929
The BBC Symphony Orchestra is formed in London.
The song "Body and Soul" is written by Johnny Green with lyrics by Edward Heyman, Robert Sour and Frank Eyton in New York City for the British actress Gertrude Lawrence who first performs in London (where it is also first published). Libby Holman introduces it to the United States in the Broadway revue Three's a Crowd and Louis Armstrong is the first jazz musician to record it. There are at least 11 recordings by the end of the year and it becomes the all-time most recorded jazz standard. 
Frankie Laine sings to an audience of 5,000 at The Merry Garden Ballroom.
John Serry Sr. begins a series of extended appearances with the Waldorf-Astoria Orchestra under the conductor Misha Borr at the Waldorf-Astoria hotel in New York City
Bukka White makes his first recording.

Published popular songs
 "Across the Breakfast Table (Looking at You)" w.m. Irving Berlin, Featured in the Warner Bros. musical Mammy
 "After a Million Dreams" w. Edgar Leslie m. Walter Donaldson, Featured in the William Fox musical film Cameo Kirby
 "All I Want is Just One Girl" w. Leo Robin m. Richard A. Whiting, Featured in the Paramount musical film Paramount on Parade
 "Alone in the Rain" w.m. Dan Dougherty and Edmund Goulding, Featured in the Pathe musical film The Grand Parade
 "Alone with My Dreams" w. Gus Kahn m. Harry Archer
 "Always in All Ways" w. Leo Robin m. Richard A. Whiting & W. Franke Harling.  Introduced by Jeanette MacDonald in the Paramount musical film Monte Carlo.
 "Any Time's the Time to Fall in Love" w.m. Elsie Janis and Jack King, Featured in the Paramount musical film Paramount on Parade
 "A Bench in the Park" w. Jack Yellen m. Milton Ager, Featured in the Universal musical film King of Jazz
 "Betty Co-Ed" w.m. J. Paul Fogarty & Rudy Vallee
 "Beware of Love" m.w. William Kernell, Featured in the William Fox musical film Women Everywhere
 "Beyond the Blue Horizon" w. Leo Robin m. Richard A. Whiting & W. Franke Harling.  Introduced by Jeanette MacDonald in the Paramount musical film Monte Carlo.
 "Blue Again" w. Dorothy Fields m. Jimmy McHugh. Introduced by Evelyn Hoey in The Vanderbilt Revue.
 "Blue is the Night" w.m. Fred Fisher, from the MGM musical film Their Own Desire
 "Body and Soul" w. Robert Sour, Edward Heyman & Frank Eyton m. Johnny Green
 "Bye Bye Blues" w.m. Bert Lown, Chauncey Gray, Fred Hamm & Dave Bennett 
 "Can This Be Love?" w. Paul James m. Kay Swift.  Introduced by Alice Boulden in the musical Fine and Dandy (musical)|Fine and Dandy.
 "Can't We Talk It Over?" w. Ned Washington m. Victor Young
 "Caribbean Love Song" w.m. Eugene Berton, Featured in the United Artists film Hell Harbor
 "Cheerful Little Earful" w. Ira Gershwin & Billy Rose m. Harry Warren
 "Cooking Breakfast for the One I Love" w. Billy Rose m. Henry Tobias
 "A Cottage for Sale" w. Larry Conley m. Willard Robison
 "Dancing on the Ceiling" w. Lorenz Hart m. Richard Rodgers
 "Dancing with Tears in My Eyes" w. Al Dubin m. Joe Burke, Featured in the Warner Bros. musical Dancing Sweeties
 "Dangerous Nan McGrew" w. Dan Hartman m. Al Goodhart
 "Don't Tell Him What Happened to Me" w. B. G. De Sylva & Lew Brown m. Ray Henderson
 "Down the River of Golden Dreams" w. John Klenner m. Nathaniel Shilkret
 "Embraceable You" w. Ira Gershwin m. George Gershwin
 "Exactly Like You" w. Dorothy Fields m. Jimmy McHugh
 "Falling in Love Again" w. (Eng) Sammy Lerner m. Frederick Hollander
 "Fine and Dandy" w. Paul James (pseudonym for James Warburg) m. Kay Swift
 "For You" w. Al Dubin m. Joe Burke
 "Gee, But I'd Like to Make You Happy" w.m. Larry Shay, Ward & Montgomery
 "Georgia on My Mind" w. Stuart Gorrell m. Hoagy Carmichael
 "Get Happy" w. Ted Koehler m. Harold Arlen
 "Goofus" w. Gus Kahn m. Wayne King & William Harold
 "Happy Feet" w. Jack Yellen m. Milton Ager
 "I Am Only Human After All" w. Ira Gershwin & E. Y. Harburg m. Vernon Duke
 "I Bring a Love Song" w. Oscar Hammerstein II m. Sigmund Romberg from the musical film Viennese Nights
 "I Got Rhythm" w. Ira Gershwin m. George Gershwin from the musical Girl Crazy
 "I Love You So Much" w. Bert Kalmar m. Harry Ruby
 "If Your Kisses Can't Hold the Man You Love" w. Jack Yellen m. Vivian Ellis
 "I'm Confessin' That I Love You" w. Al J. Neiburg m. Doc Daugherty & Ellis Reynolds
 "I'm Glad I Waited" w.m. Vincent Youmans
 "I'm In the Market for You" w. Joseph McCarthy m. James F. Hanley
 "Into My Heart" w. Roy Turk m. Fred Ahlert. Introduced by Ramón Novarro in the film In Gay Madrid
 "It Happened In Monterey" w. Billy Rose m. Mabel Wayne
 "It Must Be True" w.m. Gus Arnheim, Harry Barris & Gordon Clifford
 "J'ai Deux Amours" w. Georges Koger & H. Varna m. Vincent Scotto
 "Just a Gigolo" w. (Eng) Irving Caesar (Ger) Julius Brammer m. Leonello Casucci
 "The Kiss Waltz" w. Al Dubin m. Joe Burke
 "Lady, Play Your Mandolin" w. Irving Caesar m. Oscar Levant
 "The Little Things in Life" w.m. Irving Berlin
 "Little White Lies" w.m. Walter Donaldson
 "Livin' in the Sunlight, Lovin' in the Moonlight" w. Al Lewis m. Al Sherman. Introduced by Maurice Chevalier in the film The Big Pond
 "Love for Sale" w.m. Cole Porter
 "Lucky Seven" w. Howard Dietz m. Arthur Schwartz
 "Memories of You" w. Andy Razaf m. Eubie Blake
 "My Future Just Passed" w. George Marion Jr m. Richard A. Whiting
 "Nina Rosa" w. Irving Caesar m. Sigmund Romberg
 "Nine Little Miles From Ten-Ten-Tennessee" w.m. Al Sherman & Al Lewis & Con Conrad
 "Ninety-Nine Out of a Hundred (Wanna Be Loved)" w.m. Al Sherman & Al Lewis
 "On the Sunny Side of the Street" w. Dorothy Fields m. Jimmy McHugh
 "Please Don't Talk About Me When I'm Gone" w. Sidney Clare m. Sam H. Stept
 "Sam and Delilah" w. Ira Gershwin m. George Gershwin from the musical Girl Crazy
 "Send for Me" w. Lorenz Hart m. Richard Rodgers
 "Sing, You Sinners"     w.m. W. Franke Harling & Sam Coslow. Introduced by Lillian Roth in the film Honey
 "Someday I'll Find You" w.m. Noël Coward
 "Something to Remember You By" w. Howard Dietz m. Arthur Schwartz
 "The Song of the Dawn" w. Jack Yellen m. Milton Ager from the film King of Jazz
 "Sugar Bush" w. trad. Afrikaans m. Fred Michel
 "Sweepin' the Clouds Away" w.m. Sam Coslow
 "Sweet Jennie Lee" w.m. Walter Donaldson
 "Telling it to the Daisies" w. Joe Young m. Harry Warren
 "Ten Cents a Dance" w. Lorenz Hart m. Richard Rodgers
 "Them There Eyes" w.m. Maceo Pinkard, William Tracey & Doris Tauber
 "They All Fall in Love" w.m. Cole Porter
 "Three Little Words" w. Bert Kalmar m. Harry Ruby
 "Time on My Hands" w. Harold Adamson & Mack Gordon m. Vincent Youmans
 "Two Loves Have I" w. (Eng) J. P. Murray & Barry Trivers m. Vincent Scotto
 "Walking My Baby Back Home" w.m. Roy Turk & Fred Ahlert
 "The Waltz You Saved for Me" w. Gus Kahn m. Wayne King & Emil Flindt
 "When I'm Looking At You" w. Clifford Grey m. Herbert Stothart.  Introduced by Lawrence Tibbett in the film The Rogue Song
 "When Your Hair Has Turned To Silver" w. Charles Tobias m. Peter De Rose
 "The White Dove" w. Clifford Grey m. Franz Lehár
 "Why Am I So Romantic?" w. Bert Kalmar m. Harry Ruby
 "Would You Like to Take a Walk?" w. Mort Dixon & Billy Rose m. Harry Warren
 "You Brought a New Kind of Love to Me" w.m. Sammy Fain, Irving Kahal and Pierre Norman. Introduced by Maurice Chevalier in the film The Big Pond.
 "You Will Remember Vienna" w. Oscar Hammerstein II m. Sigmund Romberg
 "You're Driving Me Crazy" w.m. Walter Donaldson

Top Popular Recordings 1930

After $75 million in sales during 1929, the stock market crash in October nearly destroyed the industry, after forty years of consistent operation. Sales fell to $18 million in 1930 and to under $6 million in 1931.

The top popular records of 1930 listed below were compiled from Joel Whitburn's Pop Memories 1890–1954, record sales reported on the "Discography of American Historical Recordings" website, and other sources as specified. Numerical rankings are approximate, there were no Billboard charts in 1930, the numbers are only used for a frame of reference.

Top Blues Recordings

"Clarksdale Moan" – Son House
"Honky Tonk Train Blues" – Meade Lux Lewis (recorded 1927)
"Preachin' Blues" – Son House
"Razor Ball" – Blind Willie McTell
"Sitting on Top of the World" – Mississippi Sheiks, National Recording Registry 2017
"Skoodle Do Do" – Big Bill Broonzy
"Somebody's Been Using That Thing" – Big Bill Broonzy

Classical music

William Alwyn – Piano Concerto No. 1
Béla Bartók – Cantata Profana
Arthur Bliss – Morning Heroes (oratorio)
Aaron Copland – Piano Variations
Jean Cras – Légende
Arthur De Greef – Piano Concerto No. 2
John Fernström - Symphony No. 3, Op. 20
Alexander Glazunov – String Quartet No. 7
Gabriel Grovlez – Sicilienne et allegro giocoso for bassoon and piano
Reynaldo Hahn – Piano Concerto in E
Howard Hanson – Symphony No. 2, Romantic
Paul Hindemith –
Des kleinen Elektromusikers Lieblinge, for three trautoniums
Konzertmusik, Op. 48, for viola and chamber orchestra
Konzertmusik, Op. 49, for piano, brass, and two harps
Konzertmusik, Op. 50, for brass and strings
Triosatz ( Rondo) for three guitars (date uncertain: possibly 1925) 
Mikhail Ippolitov-Ivanov – Turkish Fragments
John Ireland –
Legend for piano and orchestra
Piano Concerto in E-flat
Paul Juon – Quintet for Winds in B-flat major
Zoltán Kodály – Dances of Marosszék
Ernst Krenek –
Fiedellieder, for voice and piano, Op. 64 
String Quartet No. 5, Op. 65
Igor Markevitch – Concerto Grosso
Maurice Ravel – Piano Concerto for the Left Hand
Silvestre Revueltas – String Quartet No. 1
Arnold Schoenberg –
Begleitungsmusik zu einer Lichtspielszene, for orchestra, Op. 34
Sechs Stücke, for male choir, Op. 35
Ruth Crawford Seeger –
Piano Study in Mixed Accents
Four Diaphonic Suites
Three Chants for Female Chorus
Jean Sibelius 
4 Pieces for Violin and Piano, Op.115
3 Pieces for Violin and Piano, Op.116
Karelia's Fate
Kaikhosru Shapurji Sorabji – Opus clavicembalisticum
Igor Stravinsky – Symphony of Psalms
Henri Tomasi – Paysages
Heitor Villa-Lobos –
Bachianas brasileiras No. 1, for orchestra of cellos
Bachianas brasileiras No. 2, for small orchestra
Anton Webern – Quartet, for clarinet, tenor saxophone, violin, and piano, Op. 22

Opera
Ralph Benatzky – The White Horse Inn
Leoš Janáček – From the House of the Dead
Ernst Krenek – Leben des Orest (first performance); Kehraus um St Stephan (composed 1930; first performance 1990)
Kurt Weill – The Rise and Fall of the City of Mahagonny

Jazz

Musical theater
 Darling, I Love You – London production opened at the Gaiety Theatre on January 22 and ran for 147 performances
 Eldorado – London production opened at Daly's Theatre on September 3 and ran for 93 performances
 Ever Green – London production opened at the Adelphi Theatre on December 3 and ran for 254 performances
 Fine and Dandy – Broadway musical opened at the Erlanger's Theatre on September 23 and ran for 246 performances.
 Follow a Star London production opened at the Winter Garden Theatre on September 17 and ran for 118 performances
 Girl Crazy – Broadway production opened at the Alvin Theatre on October 14 and ran for 272 performances
 Here Comes the Bride – London production opened at the Piccadilly Theatre on February 20 and ran for 175 performances
 Das Land Des Lächelns – Vienna production opened at the Theater an der Wien on September 26 and ran for 105 performances
 Little Tommy Tucker – London production opened at Daly's Theatre on November 19 and ran for 83 performances
 The Love Race – London production opened at the Gaiety Theatre on June 25 and ran for 237 performances
 The New Yorkers (Book by Herbert Fields, Lyrics & Music by Cole Porter) – Broadway revue opened at the Broadway Theatre on December 8 and ran for 168 performances
 Nippy – London production opened at the Prince Edward Theatre on October 30 and ran for 137 performances
 Rio Rita – London production opened at the Prince Edward Theatre on April 3 and ran for 59 performances
 The Second Little Show – Broadway revue opened at the Royale Theatre on September 2 and ran for 63 performances
 Silver Wings – London production opened at the Dominion Theatre on February 14 and ran for 120 performances
 Sons o' Guns – London production opened at the Hippodrome on June 26 and ran for 211 performances
 Sweet and Low – Broadway revue opened at Chanin's 46th Street Theatre on November 17 and ran for 184 performances
 The Three Musketeers – London production opened at the Drury Lane Theatre on March 28 and ran for 240 performances
 Three's a Crowd – Broadway revue opened at the Selwyn Theatre on October 15 and ran for 271 performances
 The Vanderbilt Revue Broadway revue opened at the Vanderbilt Theatre on November 5 and ran for 13 performances
 Viktoria und ihr Husar – Vienna production opened at the Theater an der Wien on December 23 and ran for 121 performances
 The White Horse Inn – Ralph Benatzky. First performed at the Grosses Schauspielhaus in Berlin on November 8.
 Wonder Bar London production opened at the Savoy Theatre on December 5 and ran for 210 performances

Musical films
 Along Came Youth starring Charles "Buddy" Rogers, Frances Dee and Stuart Erwin.  Directed by Lloyd Corrigan and Norman McLeod.
 Animal Crackers, starring the Marx Brothers, Lillian Roth and Margaret Dumont.  Directed by Victor Heerman.
 Be Yourself!, starring Fanny Brice, Harry Green and Robert Armstrong.  Directed by Thornton Freeland.
 Big Boy, starring Al Jolson and Claudia Dell.  Directed by Alan Crosland.
 The Big Pond, starring Maurice Chevalier and Claudette Colbert.  Directed by Hobart Henley.
 Bride of the Regiment, starring Walter Pidgeon and Vivienne Segal
 Bright Lights, starring Dorothy Mackaill, Frank Fay, Noah Beery, Inez Courtney and Eddie Nugent.  Directed by Michael Curtiz.
 Chasing Rainbows starring Bessie Love, Charles King, Jack Benny and Marie Dressler
 Children of Pleasure starring Lawrence Gray
 The Cuckoos starring Bert Wheeler and Robert Woolsey
 Dancing Sweeties starring Grant Withers, Sue Carol and Edna Murphy
 Dixiana starring Bebe Daniels and Everett Marshall
 End of the Rainbow (Das lockende Ziel), starring Richard Tauber, Lucie Englisch and Sophie Pagay, with music by Paul Dessau
 Follow Thru starring Charles "Buddy" Rogers, Nancy Carroll, Zelma O'Neal, Jack Haley, Eugene Pallette and Thelma Todd
 Going Wild starring Joe E. Brown and Ona Munson
 Golden Dawn, released on June 14, starring Walter Woolf King, Vivienne Segal, Noah Beery, Alice Gentle and Lupino Lane
 Good News, starring Bessie Love, Cliff Edwards and Penny Singleton and featuring Abe Lyman & his Band
 Heads Up, starring Charles "Buddy" Rogers and Helen Kane.  Directed by Victor Schertzinger.
 High Society Blues, starring Janet Gaynor, Charles Farrell and Louise Fazenda
 Hit the Deck, starring Jack Oakie, Polly Walker and June Clyde
 Hold Everything, starring Winnie Lightner and Joe E. Brown
 Honey, starring Nancy Carroll, Lillian Roth and Mitzi Green
 In Gay Madrid, starring Ramón Novarro and Dorothy Jordan
 King of Jazz, starring Paul Whiteman and John Boles and featuring The Rhythm Boys and The Brox Sisters
 Leathernecking, starring Irene Dunne
 Let's Go Native, starring Jack Oakie, Jeanette MacDonald and James Hall
 Life of the Party, starring Winnie Lightner and Jack Whiting
 The Lottery Bride, starring Jeanette MacDonald, Zasu Pitts, Joe E. Brown and John Garrick.  Directed by Paul L. Stein.
 Love Comes Along, starring Bebe Daniels
 Madam Satan, starring Kay Johnson and Reginald Denny
 Mammy, starring Al Jolson
 Maybe It's Love, starring Joe E. Brown, James Hall and Joan Bennett
 Monte Carlo, starring Jeanette MacDonald and Jack Buchanan.  Directed by Ernst Lubitsch.
 New Moon starring Lawrence Tibbett and Grace Moore
 New Movietone Follies of 1930 starring El Brendel and Marjorie White
 No, No Nanette starring ZaSu Pitts, Louise Fazenda, Lilyan Tashman and Mildred Harris
 Oh Sailor Behave starring Charles King and Irene Delroy
 Paramount on Parade featuring Maurice Chevalier and Clara Bow
 Puttin' on the Ritz starring Harry Richman, Joan Bennett and James Gleason
 Rendezvous (Komm' zu mir zum Rendezvous), starring Lucie Englisch, Ralph Arthur Roberts and Alexa Engström, with music by Artur Guttmann
 The Rogue Song released May 10 starring Lawrence Tibbett and Catherine Dale Owen and featuring Stan Laurel and Oliver Hardy
 She Couldn't Say No starring Winnie Lightner
 Show Girl In Hollywood starring Alice White
 Song o' My Heart released September 7 starring John McCormack.
 Song of the Flame starring Bernice Claire and Noah Beery
 Song of the West starring John Boles and Vivienne Segal
 Spring Is Here starring Lawrence Gray, Bernice Claire, Inez Courtney, Frank Albertson and The Brox Sisters.
 Sunny starring Marilyn Miller, Lawrence Gray and Joe Donahue.
 Sunny Skies starring Benny Rubin, Marceline Day, Rex Lease and Marjorie Kane
 Sweet Kitty Bellairs starring Claudia Dell and Walter Pidgeon
 Swing High starring Helen Twelvetress and Fred Scott
 Top Speed starring Bernice Claire, Jack Whiting and Joe E. Brown
 Under a Texas Moon starring Frank Fay, Myrna Loy and Noah Beery
 Under the Roofs of Paris (Sous les toits de Paris) starring Albert Préjean, with music by Armand Bernard, Raoul Moretti and René Nazelles
 The Immortal Vagabond (Der unsterbliche Lump), starring Liane Haid, Gustav Fröhlich and Hans Adalbert Schlettow.
 The Vagabond King starring Dennis King, Jeanette MacDonald and Lillian Roth
 Viennese Nights released November 26 starring Vivienne Segal, Jean Hersholt, Walter Pidgeon and Louise Fazenda.
 What a Widow! starring Gloria Swanson
 When Naples Sings (Napoli che canta), starring Malcolm Tod, with music by Ernesto Tagliaferri
 Whoopee! starring Eddie Cantor, Ethel Shutta and featuring George Olsen & his Orchestra and Betty Grable
 Young Man of Manhattan starring Claudette Colbert, Ginger Rogers, Norman Foster and Charles Ruggles.  Directed by Monta Bell.

Births
January 2 – Julius La Rosa, American singer (d. 2016)
January 5 – Don Rondo, American singer (d. 2011)
January 7 – Jack Greene, American country music singer and songwriter (d. 2013)
January 10 – Lyle Ritz, American jazz ukulele musician (d. 2017)
January 12 – Glenn Yarbrough, American folk singer (The Limelighters) (d. 2016)
January 13 – Bobby Lester, American singer (The Moonglows) (d. 1980)
January 17 – Dick Contino, American accordionist and singer (d. 2017)
January 27 
 Bobby Blue Bland, American blues and soul singer (d. 2013)
 Usko Meriläinen, Finnish composer (d. 2004)
January 29 – Derek Bailey, English guitarist (d. 2005)
January 31 – Al De Lory, American record producer, arranger, musician (d. 2012)
February 7 – Ikutaro Kakehashi, Japanese electronic music engineer (d. 2017)
February 22 – Marni Nixon, American soprano, best known for film dubbing (d. 2016)
February 26 – Chic Hetti, American pianist and vocalist (The Playmates)
March 1 – Gagik Hovunts, Armenian composer (d. 2019)
March 6 – Lorin Maazel, American conductor (d. 2014)
March 9 – Ornette Coleman, American jazz saxophonist, trumpeter and composer  (d. 2015)
March 13 
 Liz Anderson, American country music singer and songwriter (d. 2011)
 Jan Howard, American country singer (d. 2020)
 Blue Mitchell, American trumpet player (d. 1979) 
March 17 – Paul Horn, American jazz and new age flautist (d. 2014)
March 22 – Stephen Sondheim, American musical theater composer and lyricist (d. 2021)
March 26 – Sivuca, Brazilian guitarist and accordionist (d. 2006)
March 28 – Robert Ashley, American composer (d. 2014)
March 29 – Donny Conn, American drummer (The Playmates) (d. 2015)
March 30 – Sterling Betancourt, Trinidadian steelpan player
April 5 – Mary Costa, American opera singer and actress 
April 8 – Jean Guillou, French composer, organist, pianist and pedagogue (d. 2019)
April 10 – Claude Bolling, French jazz pianist and composer (d. 2020)
April 16 – Herbie Mann, American jazz musician (d. 2003)
April 17 – Chris Barber, English jazz trombonist and bandleader (d. 2021)
May 1 – Little Walter, American blues musician (d. 1968)
May 8 – Heather Harper, Northern Irish operatic soprano (d. 2019)
May 16 – Friedrich Gulda, Austrian pianist and composer (d. 2000)
May 22 – Kenny Ball, English jazz trumpeter, singer and bandleader (d. 2013) 
May 28 – Julian Slade, English musical theatre writer (d. 2006)
May 31 – Uno Loop, Estonian singer and guitarist (d. 2021)
June 3 – Dakota Staton, American jazz vocalist (d. 2007)
June 4 – Morgana King, American jazz vocalist (d. 2018)
June 9
Buddy Bregman, American composer and conductor (d. 2017)
Monique Serf, French singer ("Barbara") (d. 1997)
July 2 – Ahmad Jamal, American jazz pianist and composer
July 3 – Carlos Kleiber, Austrian conductor (d. 2004)
July 6 – M. Balamuralikrishna, Indian Carnatic vocalist, multi-instrumentalist, playback singer, composer and actor (d. 2016)
July 10 – Josephine Veasey, English operatic mezzo-soprano
July 16 – Guy Béart, French singer and songwriter (d. 2015)
July 20 
 Sally Ann Howes, English actress and singer
 Oleg Anofriyev, Russian actor, singer, songwriter, film director and poet (d. 2018)
July 21 – Helen Merrill, American jazz vocalist
July 25 – Annie Ross, British-American singer (died 2020)
July 27 – Andy White, Scottish-born session drummer (d. 2015)
July 28 – Firoza Begum, Bangladeshi singer (d. 2014)
August 1
Lionel Bart, English composer and lyricist (d. 1999)
Walter Jagiello, Polish polka musician and songwriter (d. 2006)
August 6 – Abbey Lincoln, American singer (d. 2010)
August 7 – Veljo Tormis, Estonian composer (d. 2017)
August 10 – Jorma Panula, Finnish conductor and composer
August 11 – Heinz Werner Zimmermann, German composer (d. 2022)
August 16 – Flor Silvestre, Mexican singer, actress and equestrienne (d. 2020)
August 24 – Tony Davis, English folk singer (The Spinners) (d. 2017)
September 7 – Sonny Rollins, jazz saxophonist
September 12 – Larry Austin, American composer (d. 2018)
September 23 – Ray Charles, American soul musician (d. 2004)
September 26 
 Alice Harnoncourt, Austrian classical violinist 
 Fritz Wunderlich, German tenor singer (d. 1966)
September 29 
 Richard Bonynge, Australian pianist and conductor
 Billy Strange, American singer-songwriter and guitarist (d. 2012)
October 1 – Richard Harris, Irish actor and singer (d. 2002)
October 5 – John Carmichael, pianist, composer and music therapist
October 8 – Tōru Takemitsu, composer (d. 1996)
October 12 – Cyril Tawney, English traditional singer-songwriter (d. 2005)
October 23 – Boozoo Chavis, American accordionist (d. 2001)
October 24 – The Big Bopper, American DJ and singer (d. 1957)
October 29 
 Omara Portuondo, Cuban singer and dancer
 Natalie Sleeth, American composer (d. 1992)
October 30
Clifford Brown, American jazz trumpeter (d. 1956)
Stanley Sadie, English musicologist (d. 2005)
November 12 – Bob Crewe, American singer, songwriter, manager, and producer (d. 2014)
November 20 – Curly Putman, American songwriter (d. 2016)
November 22 – Peter Hurford, Englsish organist and composer (d. 2019)
December 17 – Makoto Moroi, Japanese composer (d. 2013)
December 31 – Odetta, American singer, songwriter and civil rights activist (d. 2008)
Date unknown – Munir Bashir, Iraqi Assyrian musician and oud player (d. 1997)

Deaths
January 2 – Therese Malten, German operatic soprano, 74
January 16 – Art Hickman, American bandleader, 43 (Banti's syndrome)
January 17 – Gauhar Jaan, Indian singer and dancer, 56
January 24 – Mario Sammarco, Italian operatic baritone, 61
January 27 – Jean Huré, composer and organist (born 1877)
January 28 – Emmy Destinn Czech operatic soprano, 51 (stroke)
February 12 – Eva Dell'Acqua, Belgian singer and composer, 73
February 13 – Conrad Ansorge, German pianist, teacher and composer, 67
February 17 – Louise Kirkby Lunn, English operatic contralto, 56
February 23 – Horst Wessel, Nazi ideologue and composer, 22
March 7 – A. L. Erlanger, American theatrical impresario, 70
March 13 – August Stradal, virtouso pianist and composer, 69
March 16 – George Allan, English arranger and composer, 55
April 1 – Cosima Wagner, daughter of Franz Liszt and widow of Richard Wagner, 92
April 3 – Emma Albani, Canadian-British operatic soprano (born 1847)
April 5 – Gene Greene, singer and composer ("The Ragtime King"), 48
April 9 – Rose Caron, French operatic soprano, 72
April 24 – Adele Ritchie, American singer, comic opera, musical comedy and vaudeville, 55
April 26 – Beth Slater Whitson, American lyric writer, 50
April 28 – Charles Grandmougin, lyricist (born 1850)
May 1 – Emil Genetz, Finnish composer, 77
May 29 – Tivadar Nachéz, Hungarian violinist and composer, 71
June 5 – Irma Reichová, Czech operatic soprano, 71
June 7 – Nahan Franko, American violinist and conductor, 68 
June 22 – Mary Davies, Welsh singer, 75
July 15 – Leopold Auer, Hungarian violinist, 85
August 4 – Siegfried Wagner, German composer and conductor, son of Richard Wagner, 61 
August 9 – Johnny Burke, Canadian singer and songwriter (b. 1851)
August 20 – George John Bennett, English composer (born 1863)
October 1 – Riccardo Drigo, Italian composer and conductor, 84
October 14 – Henry Creamer, American songwriter, 51
October 27 – Evan Stephens, American Mormon composer and hymn-writer, 76
November 13 – Thomas Bulch, English-born Australian musician and composer, 67
November 14 – Jacques Isnardon, French operatic bass-baritone, 70
December 17 – Peter Warlock, English composer, 36
December 22 – Charles K. Harris, American songwriter and publisher, 63
December 23 – Marie Fillunger, Austrian singer, 80
December 24 – Oskar Nedbal, Czech violist, conductor and composer, 56
December 29 – Oscar Borg, Norwegian composer, 79

References

 
20th century in music
Music by year